There have been two separate creations of Elliot baronets: The first has merged with a higher title, and the second has become extinct.

Elliot baronets of Minto, Roxburgh (19 April 1700)
See Earl of Minto

Elliot baronets of Penshaw, County Durham and of Whitby, North Riding of York (15 May 1874)
This baronetcy was created in 1874 in the Baronetage of the United Kingdom. It became extinct in 1911 upon the death of the fourth baronet.

Sir George Elliot, 1st Baronet (1814–1893)
Sir George William Elliot, 2nd Baronet (1844–1895)
Sir George Elliot, 3rd Baronet (1867–1904)
Sir Charles Elliot, 4th Baronet (1873–1911), married on 1903 Helena Louise, youngest daughter of the late Benjamin Piercy.

References

Sources

Baronetcies in the Baronetage of Nova Scotia
Extinct baronetcies in the Baronetage of the United Kingdom
1700 establishments in Nova Scotia
1874 establishments in the United Kingdom